Sporting Club de Gagnoa, commonly known as SC Gagnoa, is an Ivorian football club. They were promoted to the highest level of football in Ivory Coast. The football club is based in the city of Gagnoa. Stade de Mama is their home stadium. It has a 5,000 capacity.

Honours
Ivorian Ligue 1
Champions (1): 1976
Coupe de Côte d'Ivoire
Runners-up (7): 1971, 1975, 1978, 1979, 1984, 1985, 1990
Coupe Houphouët-Boigny
Champions (2): 1976, 1978

Performance in CAF competitions
 African Cup of Champions Clubs / CAF Champions League: 1 appearance
1977 – Second round

CAF Confederation Cup: 2 appearances
2016 – First round
2017 – First round

CAF Cup: 1 appearance
1992 – Quarter-finals

African Cup Winners' Cup: 3 appearances
1979 – Second round
1986 – First round
1991 – Second round

Current squad

External links
Club profile at Soccerway
Ligue 1 Ivory Coast Profile at ligue1-ci.com

Football clubs in Ivory Coast
Sport in Gôh-Djiboua District
Gagnoa
1960 establishments in Ivory Coast
Association football clubs established in 1960